William Summerville Haymond (February 20, 1823 – December 24, 1885) was an American physician and Civil War veteran who served one term as a U.S. Representative from Indiana from 1875 to 1877.

Biography 
Born near Clarksburg, Virginia (now West Virginia), Haymond attended the common schools and was graduated from Bellevue Hospital Medical College, New York City.
He commenced the practice of his profession at Monticello, Indiana, in 1852.
During the Civil War entered the Union Army as a surgeon in 1862 and served one year.

He was an unsuccessful candidate for the State senate in 1866.
He served as president of the Indianapolis, Delphi & Chicago Railroad Co. 1872–1874.

Congress 
Haymond was elected as a Democrat to the Forty-fourth Congress (March 4, 1875 – March 4, 1877).
He was an unsuccessful candidate for reelection in 1876 to the Forty-fifth Congress.

Later career and death 
He resumed his former professional and business activities.
Organized the Central Medical College in Indianapolis in 1877 and was dean until his death.
Published in 1879 a history of Indiana.

He died in Indianapolis, Indiana, December 24, 1885.
He was interred in Crown Hill Cemetery.

References

1823 births
1885 deaths
Burials at Crown Hill Cemetery
People of Indiana in the American Civil War
Politicians from Clarksburg, West Virginia
Union Army surgeons
Democratic Party members of the United States House of Representatives from Indiana
People from Monticello, Indiana
19th-century American politicians
Physicians from West Virginia
Military personnel from Clarksburg, West Virginia